William Payne may refer to:

Educators
 William K. Payne (1903–1963), American university president
 William Morton Payne (1858–1919), American educator and writer
 William Oscar Payne (1879–1944), professor of history at the University of Georgia
 William Payne (mathematician) (died 1779), English mathematician and author
 William H. Payne (1836–1907), American educator and translator

Politicians
 William D. Payne (born 1932), American Democratic Party politician
 William Edward Payne (born 1933), Alberta MLA, 1979–1993
 William Ernest Payne (1878–1943), Alberta MLA, 1931–1935
 William Hector Payne (1914–1989), Canadian Member of Parliament, 1958–1962
 William Winter Payne (1807–1874), U.S. Representative from Alabama
 William Payne (sheriff) (1725–1782), Fairfax County sheriff
 William Payne (New Mexico politician) (born 1951), Republican politician

Sportspeople
 William Porter Payne (born 1947), chairman of Augusta National Golf Club, president and CEO of the Atlanta Committee for the Olympic Games (ACOG)
 William Payne (cricketer) (1854–1909), English cricketer
 Bill Payne (athlete) (born 1967), retired American pole vaulter
 Billy Payne (footballer) (1881–1967), Australian rules footballer with Carlton
 Bill Payne (footballer, born 1883) (1883–1940), Australian rules footballer with Fitzroy

Others
 William Payne (priest) (1650–1696), English controversialist
 William Payne (painter) (1760–1830), British painter
 William Payne (pantomimist) (1804–1878), actor and pantomimist and father of the Payne Brothers
 William H. F. Payne (1830–1904), general in the American Civil War
 Will Payne (television producer) (born 1974), television producer, writer and director
 Will Payne (actor) (born 1989), English actor
 Bill Payne (born 1949), musician, keyboardist and founder of the band Little Feat
 Bill Payne (oiler) - cofounder of Helmerich & Payne

See also 
 William Paine (disambiguation)
 William Payne-Gallwey (disambiguation)